The men's individual normal hill/10 km Nordic combined competition for the 2010 Winter Olympics in Vancouver, Canada, was held at Whistler Olympic Park in Whistler, British Columbia, on 14 February.

Germany's Georg Hettich was the defending Olympic champion when the event was known as the 15 km Individual Gundersen, but did not compete in this event. Todd Lodwick of the United States was the defending world champion in this event and would finish fourth in the Olympic event. The last World Cup event prior to the 2010 Games in this format took place on 31 January 2010 in Seefeld, Austria, and was won by Austria's Mario Stecher who would finish seventh. Seefeld was where the Nordic Combined events took place for both the 1964 and the 1976 Winter Olympics, held in neighboring Innsbruck, took place.

Results

Ski jumping
The ski jumping took place with a trial round at 09:00 PST and the competition round at 10:00 PST. One jump in competition was scored similar to that of ski jumping. Finland's Ryynänen had the longest jump to grab the lead after the jump.

Cross-country
The start for the 10 kilometre race was staggered, with a one-point deficit in the ski jump portion resulting in a four-second deficit in starting the cross-country course. This stagger meant that the first athlete across the finish line would be the overall winner of the event. Cross-country skiing's part of the competition took place at 13:45 PST that same day.

Ryynänen would lead until close to the end of the last part of the first lap before taking a spill where he never recovered. The Finn would finish 26th. A group of eight skiers developed during the middle part of the race which had Bill Demong move from 24th to the final lead group by the 7.5 km mark. Japan's Norihito Kobayashi grabbed the lead with 800 m left only to be passed by Johnny Spillane of the US, France's Jason Lamy-Chappuis, Italy's Alessandro Pittin, and Spillane's teammate Lodwick. Lamy-Chappuis passed Spillane right before the final sprint though Spillane mounted a final charge that fell 0.4 seconds short. Norway's Magnus Moan had the fastest time in the cross-country skiing portion of the event to move from 40th to ninth. It was the first individual medal for all three competitors, along with being the first medals for both the US and Italy in Nordic combined at the Winter Olympics. Italy's best finish prior to this event in Nordic combined was fifth by Ezio Damolin at the 1968 Winter Olympics in Grenoble.

References

Nordic combined at the 2010 Winter Olympics